Karim Khan  ( also transliterated as Karīm Khān) is a Persian name. It may refer to:

People
Karim Khan (1705–1779), founder of the Zand Dynasty
Karim Khan (cricketer) (born 1984), Afghan cricketer
Karim Ahmad Khan, British Chief Prosecutor of the International Criminal Court
Karim Khan Kermani (1810–1873), Shia Islamic scholar
Abdul Karim Khan (1872–1937), Indian singer
Abdal-Karim Khan Astrakhani (died 1520), Khan of Astrakhan
Prince Karim Khan, 20th-century Balochi noble
Abdul Karim Khan (Yarkand), 16th-century ruler of Yarkand Khanate
Karim M. Khan, a Canadian/Australian sport and exercise medicine physician

Places in Iran
Arg of Karim Khan, castle in Shiraz
Karim Khan Zand Boulevard, in Shiraz
Karim Khan, Iran, village in Razavi Khorasan Province
Shurabeh-ye Karim Khan, village in Lorestan Province
Mowtowr-e Karim Khan, village in Sistan and Baluchestan Province